The 2016 FIRS Women's Roller Hockey World Cup or Iquique 2016 was the 13th edition of the women's roller hockey world cup. It is held in Iquique, Chile from September 24 to October 1, 2016, and it was contested by thirteen teams. Spain defeated Portugal in the final to win the World Cup.

Group stage

Group A

The match between Italy and Colombia ended in a 1–1 tie, giving both teams 1 point. However, as Italy won on the shootout, they are awarded an advantage against Colombia for tie-breaker purposes.

Group B

Group C

H: Hosts

Play-off stages
In order to determine the order of draws during the play-offs stages, the following criteria are used:
 Group winners are placed in spots 1, 2 and 3, depending on their results in the group stage.
 Group runners-up are placed in spots 4, 5 and 6, depending on their results in the group stage.
 The two best third-placed teams are placed in spots 7 and 8, depending on their results in the group stage.
 The worst third-placed team and the fourth and fifth-placed teams failed to qualify to quarterfinals and, therefore, are forced to play and alternate play-off to determine places 9th to 13th.

Also, the following changes are made to the group stage for ordering purposes:
 For the teams in Group A, all results involved the fifth-placed team (Egypt) will be not counted, in order to calculate results in a 4-team group.
 All victories (if necessary) are reduced to only 6 goals of difference, in order to prevent scoring many goals against weaker teams to opt for better spots in play-offs.

Teams ranking for play-off

Final stage

Quarterfinals

5th-8th place play-off

Semifinals

7th-8th place match

5th-6th place match

3rd-4th place match

Final

9th-13th place play-off

Since Brazil and Egypt (Group A), United States and India (Group C) have already played each other in the group stage, its result was counted again in the play-off stage.

Final ranking

See also
FIRS Women's Roller Hockey World Cup

References

External links
 Official website
 Fédération Internationale de Roller Sports

Women's Roller Hockey World Cup
International roller hockey competitions hosted by Chile
2016 FIRS Women's World Cup
Roll
World